In the Battle of Prague or Battle of Štěrboholy, fought on 6 May 1757 during the Third Silesian War (Seven Years' War), Frederick the Great's 64,000 Prussians forced 60,000 Austrians to retreat, but having lost 14,300 men, decided he was not strong enough to attack Prague. The battle is mentioned in the famous German ballad Lenore written in 1773 by Gottfried August Bürger.

Prelude
After Frederick had forced the surrender of Saxony in the 1756 campaign, he spent the winter devising new plans for a defence of his small kingdom. It was not in his nature, nor in his military strategy, simply to sit back and defend. He began drawing up plans for another bold stroke against Austria.

In early spring the Prussian army marched in four columns over the mountain passes separating Saxony and Silesia from Bohemia. The four corps would unite at the Bohemian capital of Prague. Though risky, because it exposed the Prussian army to a defeat in detail, the plan succeeded. After Frederick's corps united with a corps under Prince Moritz, and General Bevern joined up with Schwerin, both armies converged near Prague.

Meanwhile, the Austrians had not been idle. Though initially surprised by the early Prussian attack, the able Austrian field marshal Maximilian Ulysses Count Browne had been retreating skillfully and concentrating his armed forces towards Prague. Here he established a fortified position to the east of the town, and an additional army under Prince Charles of Lorraine arrived, swelling the Austrian numbers to 60,000. The prince now took command.

The Austrian army under von Browne had taken up a near invincible position on the Ziska- and the Tabor mountains. The town was on their left flank, with a steep gorge to the north, and to the west by a marshy slope with a brook at the bottom. The two Austrian commanders were in disagreement about the course of action: von Browne wanted to attack, but Charles decided to wait for Konigseck, who had been defeated at the Battle of Reichenberg but was known to be retreating towards Prague, and possibly even for the arrival of Daun.

On 6 May, around 5 am, the Prussian army assembled to the north on the Prosek heights, 115,000 men strong, and Frederick sent Keith with 30,000 to the west of the town to cut off any Austrian retreat. The Austrians drew up for battle facing north and east.

The battle

Frederick ordered an immediate assault, but Schwerin convinced him to make a reconnaissance around the Austrian right flank. He returned with the information that gradually sloping green meadows offered a better chance for attack at the Austrian rear. The Prussian army started marching around 7 am, and succeeded in staying largely out of sight till the Austrian generals noticed the movements around 10 am. Field Marshal von Browne shifted six infantry regiments to take up position to the south east.

Schwerin, accompanied by General Winterfeldt, was finally prepared to attack. The attack was led by the infantry of Winterfeldt. The Prussian infantry soon found themselves not in meadows, but in the remains of fish ponds. While they struggled through, Winterfeldt was hit by a musketball. The Prussian infantry wavered and Schwerin rallied them, leading them from the front. He was hit several times by Austrian canister. Frederick, when he heard the news, ordered the assault to continue.

The Austrian infantry smelled the Prussian confusion and started to press the Prussians back down the slope, opening a gap between themselves and the remainder of the Austrian line still facing north. At this time von Browne was mortally wounded by Prussian infantry fire and carried into Prague.

While King Frederick and General von Zieten reorganised the Prussian infantry in the south for another attack, the generals Hautcharmoy and Bevern spotted the gap in the Austrian line and started to filter infantry into the gap. Austrian Croats had engaged Prussians to the north of the Austrian left flank, but with the gap in the Austrian line being exploited by a steady stream of Prussians he pulled back and formed a new line running south from the west end of the Tabor mountain.

The final phase of the battle started around 3 pm, with Prussians engaging the still-forming Austrian line and outflanking them from the south. Charles withdrew into the town, the retreat being covered by his cavalry.

Aftermath

The Prussian victory was at a high cost; Frederick lost over 14,000 men, and two of his best generals were out of action (Schwerin was killed by enemy fire and Winterfeldt was severely wounded).  Prince Charles had also suffered heavily, losing 8,900 men killed or wounded and 4,500 prisoners.  Given the high casualties he had suffered, Frederick decided to lay siege rather than launch a direct assault on the walls of Prague. He calculated that 40,000 soldiers, in addition to 75,000 inhabitants, would soon consume the city stores.

His calculation, however, did not take into account the relief army Austria managed to field against him at the Battle of Kolin, and he was soon forced to abandon the siege.

Footnotes

References
 
 Szabo, Franz. The Seven Years War in Europe: 1756–1763. Routledge, 2013,  .
 

Battles of the Seven Years' War
Battle 1757
Battle of Prague (1757)
Battles involving Prussia
Battles involving Austria
Battle of Prague
1757 in the Holy Roman Empire
18th century in Bohemia
Battle of Prague 1757
Battles of Frederick the Great
Battles in Bohemia
Battles of the Silesian Wars